Bela Soos (6 March 1930, in Târgu Mureș – 12 September 2007, in Frankfurt) was a Romanian chess player who was awarded the title of International Master in 1967. As a youth, he was a football player, representing Dinamo Bucharest during his military service. He represented Romania in 4 chess olympiads in 1956, 1962, 1966 and 1968, before defecting to West Germany in the early 1970s. Following his defection, all further mention of him was suppressed in Romanian publications. He is noted for two wins over leading Soviet grandmaster Efim Geller, including a crushing win in 23 moves at the 1962 olympiad in Varna, Bulgaria.

References

External links

Romanian chess players
Romanian sportspeople of Hungarian descent
German chess players
Chess International Masters
Chess Olympiad competitors
20th-century chess players
1930 births
2007 deaths